Lizard Township is a township in Pocahontas County, Iowa, USA.

History
Lizard Township was established in 1859. It is named for the Lizard Creek, which was said by Native Americans to resemble a lizard.

References

Townships in Pocahontas County, Iowa
Townships in Iowa